This was the first edition of the tournament.

Venus Williams won the title, defeating Misaki Doi in the final, 6–4, 6–2. It is her only title of 2016.

Seeds

Draw

Finals

Top half

Bottom half

Qualifying

Seeds

Qualifiers

Lucky losers

Draw

First qualifier

Second qualifier

Third qualifier

Fourth qualifier

Fifth qualifier

Sixth qualifier

References
 Main Draw
 Qualifying Draw

Taiwan Open
WTA Taiwan Open